Daniel Lee was a Methodist missionary to the Oregon Country in the Pacific Northwest of North America, beginning in 1834. He accompanied his uncle Jason Lee on the mission, and recounted many of his experiences along with Joseph H. Frost. He married Maria T. Ware, a teacher.

References

External links 
 Methodist reports published in Oregon Historical Quarterly, 1922.
 wikisource:en:History of Oregon (Bancroft)/Volume 1/Chapter 7

American Methodist missionaries
Methodist Mission in Oregon
Methodist missionaries in the United States
Oregon clergy
Oregon Country
Oregon pioneers